Harry Pratt Lyons (March 25, 1866 – June 30, 1912) born in Chester, Pennsylvania, was an Outfielder for the Philadelphia Quakers (1887), St. Louis Browns (1887–88), New York Giants (1889 and 1892–93) and Rochester Broncos (1890).

He helped the Browns win the 1887 and 1888 American Association Pennants and the Giants win the 1889 championship.

He led the American Association in At Bats (584) and Outs (432) in 1890.

In 6 seasons he played in 407 Games and had 1,713 At Bats, 246 Runs, 401 Hits, 31 Doubles, 21 Triples, 7 Home Runs, 198 RBI, 120 Stolen Bases, 97 Walks, .234 Batting Average, .277 On-base percentage, .289 Slugging Percentage and 495 Total Bases.

He died in Mauricetown, New Jersey at the age of 46 and was interred at West Laurel Hill Cemetery in Philadelphia, Pennsylvania.

Sources

1866 births
1912 deaths
Baseball players from Pennsylvania
Burials at West Laurel Hill Cemetery
Major League Baseball center fielders
Major League Baseball left fielders
Philadelphia Quakers players
St. Louis Browns (AA) players
New York Giants (NL) players
Rochester Broncos players
19th-century baseball players
Oswego Starchboxes players
Binghamton Crickets (1880s) players
Ashland (minor league baseball) players
Portland (minor league baseball) players
Worcester Grays players
Jersey City Skeeters players
Buffalo Bisons (minor league) players
Philadelphia Athletics (minor league) players
Providence Clamdiggers (baseball) players
Providence Grays (minor league) players
Sportspeople from Chester, Pennsylvania